Estadio Calixto García Íñiguez is a multi-use stadium in Holguín, Cuba. It is currently used mostly for baseball games and is the home stadium of the Sabuesos de Holguín. The stadium holds 30,000 people.

The stadium is named after Cuban patriot Calixto García.

History
The Estadio Calixto García Íñiguez was inaugurated on 10 February 1979 with a match between the local Holguín baseball team and the Villa Clara team.

The stadium hosted the 2003 Baseball World Cup.

References

Baseball venues in Cuba
Buildings and structures in Holguín
Buildings and structures in Holguín Province